Stumpke Corner is an unincorporated community in Franklin Township, Ripley County, in the U.S. state of Indiana.

History
A post office was established at Stumpke Corner in 1878, and remained in operation until it was discontinued in 1895. Henry Stumke served as postmaster, and gave the community his name.

Geography

References

Unincorporated communities in Ripley County, Indiana
Unincorporated communities in Indiana